Meitav (lit. Utmost, best) is a moshav in north-eastern Israel. Located in the Ta'anakh region, it falls under the jurisdiction of Gilboa Regional Council.

History
The moshav was established in 1954 by immigrants from Kurdistan and Iraq  on the land of the depopulated Palestinian village of Al-Mazar.  The third settlement to be founded in the Ta'anakh, it was initially named Ta'anakh Gimel (lit. Ta'anakh 3). The name derives from Bereshit/Genesis 47,11: "Joseph ... gave them property in the best part of the land."

References

Iranian-Jewish culture in Israel
Iraqi-Jewish culture in Israel
Kurdish-Jewish culture in Israel
Moshavim
Populated places established in 1954
Populated places in Northern District (Israel)
1954 establishments in Israel